Juan Horacio Suárez (born 12 March 1938; Villa Nueva) is an Argentine Roman Catholic bishop.

Ordained to the priesthood on 2 December 1967, Suárez was named bishop of the Roman Catholic Diocese of Gregorio de Laferrere, Argentina on 25 November 2000 and retired on 19 December 2013. After retirement he became a priest at the San José parish, in a town Villa María.

References

1938 births
Living people
People from Buenos Aires Province
21st-century Roman Catholic bishops in Argentina
Roman Catholic bishops of Gregorio de Laferrère